The 2010 Odlum Brown Vancouver Open was a professional tennis tournament played on outdoor hard courts. It was the 6th edition, for men, and 9th edition, for women, of the tournament and part of the 2010 ATP Challenger Tour and the 2010 ITF Women's Circuit, offering totals of $100,000, for men, and $75,000, for women, in prize money. It took place in West Vancouver, British Columbia, Canada between August 2 and August 8, 2010.

Men's singles main-draw entrants

Seeds

1 Rankings are as of July 26, 2010

Other entrants
The following players received wildcards into the singles main draw:
 Philip Bester
 Andrea Collarini
 Ryan Harrison
 Vasek Pospisil

The following players entered the singles main draw with a special exempt:
 Frank Dancevic
 Milos Raonic

The following players received entry from the qualifying draw:
 Steven Diez
 Brydan Klein
 Alex Kuznetsov
 James Ward

Champions

Men's singles

 Dudi Sela def.  Ričardas Berankis, 7–5, 6–2

Women's singles

 Jelena Dokić def.  Virginie Razzano, 6–1, 6–4

Men's doubles

 Treat Conrad Huey /  Dominic Inglot def.  Ryan Harrison /  Jesse Levine, 6–4, 7–5

Women's doubles

 Chang Kai-chen /  Heidi El Tabakh def.  Irina Falconi /  Amanda Fink, 3–6, 6–3, [10–4]

External links
Official website

Odlum Brown Vancouver Open
Odlum Brown Vancouver Open
Vancouver Open
Odlum Brown Vancouver Open
Odlum Brown Vancouver Open